Livyi Bereh (Left Bank) is a railway stop that is located in Kyiv, Ukraine. It is part of the Kyiv Directorate of (Southwestern Railways).

References

Railway stations in Kyiv
Southwestern Railways stations
Railway stations opened in 1909
1909 establishments in Ukraine